Izzatdaar is a 1990 Indian Hindi-language film starring Dilip Kumar, Govinda, Madhuri Dixit, Anupam Kher, Shafi Inamdar and South Indian actor Raghuvaran in his Bollywood film debut.

Synopsis
Dilip Kumar plays the role of a man set up and framed for a murder for which he is jailed, because of his scheming son-in-law, Raghuvaran. His Daughter Swapna is also killed at the hands of Raghuvaran when Raghuvaran slaps and tries to molest Madhuri Dixit when she confronts him about his evil deeds. Dilip Kumar avenges the death of his daughter and the years spent in prison. Against this backdrop, Govinda is a man who works for the underworld after he is shot as a child by Tej Sapru. After finding love with Madhuri Dixit, Govinda changes his ways and joins up with Dilip Kumar to take revenge as he too has been wronged by the same group of villains.

Music

Cast
 Dilip Kumar as Brahm Dutt
 Govinda as Vijay
 Madhuri Dixit as Mohini
 Bharathi as Sujata
 Shakti Kapoor as Jetha Shankar
 Anupam Kher as Jailor Mushtaque Ali
 Shafi Inamdar as Premchand
 Raghuvaran as Indrajeet Sabharwal
 Swapna as Sonu
 Asrani as Constable
 Yunus Parvez as Announcer
 Shiva Rindani as Shiva 
 Tej Sapru as Kubba
 Guddi Maruti as Mrs. Jetha Shankar
 Vikas Anand as Doctor		
 Dilip Dhawan as Tony
 Jack Gaud as Chhagan
 Mukri

References

External links
 
 https://web.archive.org/web/20110716191521/http://www.musichouseltd.co.uk/shop/product_info.php?manufacturers_id=15&products_id=6390

1990s Hindi-language films
Films directed by K. Bapayya
Films scored by Laxmikant–Pyarelal